Singaporenalli Raja Kulla is a 1978 Indian Kannada language action film directed by C. V. Rajendran starring Vishnuvardhan, Manjula, Dwarkish, Lokanath and Thoogudeepa Srinivas in pivotal roles.

It was the first Kannada film to be shot outside India in a country which is not a neighbouring nation  and the second Kannada movie to be shot outside India after Operation Diamond Racket (which was shot in Nepal and released four months before this movie). However, this movie is widely credited for having started the trend of shooting abroad. This was the first Kannada cinema to run over 200 days in the Belgavi region. The film was dubbed and released in Tamil as Sweet Singapore.

Plot 
A jeweller Shivaraj, who harbours ambitions of a successful life abroad, enters into a partnership with Junie after abandoning his pregnant wife and thus both land in Singapore. Unknown to Lokanath, Junie is into smuggling diamonds and various other illegal activities and is wanted by the Indian and Singaporean police department. CID detective Venu aka Kulla is assigned the task of hunting down both of them and bringing him to justice in India. Meanwhile, Lokanath's son Raja, who is now a singer in a hotel, gets to know Gopinath, though unaware that he is a detective.
Tara is Raja's girlfriend.

Initially reluctant, Raja travels to Singapore. Tara overhears his conversation with Diwakar and immediately flies to Singapore informing Raja. Meanwhile, Kulla also lands in Singapore, on his mission. But Raja is also on his cross-hairs. He assumes Raja is in Singapore to kill someone and confronts him repeatedly, with arguments and fist-to-fist fighting as well. Raja meets Shivaraj at a hotel and immediately looks at the photo that his mother has given him, of her and Shivaraj in their younger days. Raja introduces himself and says he is from Bangalore. Shivaraj is taken aback, which Raja senses, and asks if he knows anybody there, a question that makes Shivaraj uncomfortable.

As Shivaraj turns back and takes a few steps away, Raja drops that photo and calls out to Shivaraj, that he dropped something. Shivaraj picking up the photo is surprised to see that it is of him and his wife. Later, after a bitter fight between them, Raja and Kulla meet up with Shivaraj, who tells him about his meet up with Junie and how he was duped into the unlawful business. Kulla assures Shivaraj that he would help him get out of this situation. Raja and Kulla fight Junie and a chase ensues where Junie desperately tries to board a helicopter, Kulla, who is hiding in the helicopter, kicks him out and his associate, a Singapore policeman shoots Junie and kills him. Raja unites with his family.

Cast

Soundtrack 

The duo of Rajan–Nagendra composed the film's background score and music for the soundtracks, with lyrics written by Chi. Udaya Shankar. The album consists of four soundtracks. An extended part of the song "Prema Preethi Nannusiru", shot and picturised in a Singapore hotel where Raja (Vishnuvardhan) confronts Kulla (Dwarakish) in a song, is not available in the audio label. Else it would be five tracks in all.

All the songs were recorded at the England Recording Studio with 2 track stereo split recording. Audio Copyrights given to Coloumbia Records for Gramophone records, and HMV Calcutta for audio cassettes. In the track "Prema Preeti Nannusiru", it could be noticed that "Prema" is heard from in left channel and "Preethi" from the right, giving it a stereophonic effect.

References

External links 
 

1970s Kannada-language films
1978 films
Films directed by C. V. Rajendran
Films scored by Rajan–Nagendra
Films set in Singapore
Films shot in Singapore
Indian action films